Messehallen (Hamburg U-Bahn station), a subway station in Hamburg, Germany
 Messehalle, Innsbruck, a convention center in Innsbruck, Austria
 Messehalle Sindelfingen, a convention center in Sindelfingen, Germany

See also
 Mess hall
 Messe (disambiguation)
 Mashallah (disambiguation)